Əlixanlı (also, Alykhanly) is a former village in the Siazan Rayon of Azerbaijan.

References
 

Populated places in Siyazan District